Joos Lambrecht (1491, Ghent – 1556/7, Wesel) was a Walloon printer, typographer, lexicographer and linguist.

He was the son of Jan Lambrecht and came from a family of engravers of seals and marks used to authenticate cloth made in Ghent. In 1537-1538 he took up this trade taking over from Vincent Lambert, and combined it with a broad range of activities: he was a schoolmaster at the Walloon School and also wrote poetry. His work as a printer is regarded as being of particularly good quality.

His Naembouck van alle natuerlicken ende ongheschuumde Vlaemsche woorden is an important book in the history of the Dutch languages. It was a Dutch-French dictionary, French being a language he taught at the Walloon School. He printed the first edition of this book in 1546. For many years no copy was known to have survived until Wytze Hellinga discovered a copy in the library of the Groot Seminarie in Warmond in the Netherlands.

References

1491 births
Writers from Ghent
1556 deaths